Southcote was a Canadian pop band from Toronto active in the mid-1970s. Forming in 1972, they signed to Smile Records. They released the single "She" in 1973, which was a hit in Canada and reached #19 on the RPM Top Singles chart. It was released in the U.S. by Buddah Records and also reached #80 on the Billboard Hot 100 in the United States.

Members
Beau David (vocals)
Breen LeBoeuf (vocals, keyboards, bass)
Charlie White (guitar)
Lance Wright (drums)
Joe Ress (keyboards, added in 1973)

References

Musical groups with year of establishment missing
Musical groups from Toronto
Canadian pop music groups
Musical groups established in 1972
1972 establishments in Ontario